The CL-154 class of  gun light cruisers was a United States Navy project from the last two years of World War II, with antecedents reaching back to 1938 and earlier. The CL-154 class was contemporary to the  gun  light cruisers and the  gun s: like them the CL-154 design incorporated the lessons learned of World War II combat. The Navy allocated six hull numbers (CL-154 through CL-159) to the CL-154 class for the planned construction, but unlike the Worcester and Des Moines classes the CL-154 class would be cancelled with no units named or constructed. Had these ships been built, they would have been given the hull classification CLAA  (anti-aircraft light cruiser) on 18 March 1949.

Overview

The CL-154 class was the final attempt to build a "super-" by replacing the Atlantas 5-inch/38-caliber gun with the new 5-inch/54-caliber Mark 16 gun. The new gun had a higher rate of fire and a longer range than the 38-caliber gun, and fired a heavier and more destructive projectile; the only downside to the new gun was a heavier mount, faster barrel wear, and greater crew fatigue if forced into manually loading. It was slated for installation in the projected s, and its developer, the Navy's Bureau of Ordnance / BuOrd desired to find additional applications for it. A light cruiser installation for the new gun similar in design to the Atlanta class was naturally attractive to BuOrd.

The CLD
The first attempt to design a super-Atlanta using the 5-inch/54-caliber Mark 16 gun was the "Cruiser-Destroyer", or CLD of 1938. The name reflected an intended minor role of the Atlanta class as a destroyer flotilla leader. The design study ended in 1940 without any ships started due to more pressing priorities. The "ship characteristics" resulting from the study would be almost identical to that of the later CL-154 design.

World War II developments
When the United States entered World War II it had three major classes of cruisers under construction: the 5-inch gun Atlanta class, the 6-inch gun , and the 8-inch gun . These ships would form the bulk of the cruiser war construction effort, with eight Atlanta-class, twenty-seven Cleveland-class, and fourteen Baltimore-class cruisers ultimately completed (the  gun  large cruiser program would result in only two ships). As the Navy gained experience with combat conditions, it was decided that all three classes needed improvement. However, major improvements would cause unacceptable delays in the construction programs. It was decided that these three classes would be succeeded by two new generations, an "interim" generation with minor improvements that were easily added during the war, and a later generation near the war's end which would incorporate major improvements including new gun types.

The "interim" generation would consist of the 5-inch gun , the 6-inch gun , and the 8-inch gun . By late 1944 the Navy had realized that the ship construction program could be cut back due to the near-total destruction of the Imperial Japanese Navy. The number of the ships of this generation to be completed as gun cruisers would be small in comparison to the previous generation: three Juneau-class, two Fargo-class, and three Oregon City-class cruisers.

The later – and as it would turn out, final – generation of gun cruisers met the same fate as the "interim" generation: only a handful were completed. The German introduction of anti-ship guided missiles and the Japanese use of kamikaze attacks (which were in effect missiles guided under direct human control) made all anti-aircraft guns smaller than the 3-inch gun obsolete and increased pressure to adopt 5- and 6-inch dual purpose (DP) guns which were capable of attacking both airborne and surface targets at longer ranges and with higher rates of fire. BuOrd had begun development of such gun designs in the 1930s, including the 5-inch/54-caliber Mark 16, and had continued to push for ships that would act as testbeds for their new guns. The Navy agreed in the waning days of World War II to construct a small number of cruisers for this purpose: the 5-inch gun CL-154 class, the 6-inch gun Worcester class, and the 8-inch gun Des Moines class. Initially the Navy wanted at least one squadron of six ships of each class, but in the end only two Worcester-class and three Des Moines-class cruisers would be completed, and the CL-154 class would be cancelled in its entirety.

The CL-154 class
BuOrd had again proposed a 5-inch/54 caliber gun cruiser in June 1942, and the Bureau of Ships / BuShips noted that two unfinished Atlanta-class hulls could be converted if one less turret was installed and other compensations were made (for example, increasing the beam of the ships by a foot, or reducing the armor thickness). The General Board killed the proposal two months later largely on logistical grounds (i.e., the difficulties of adding a new ammunition type to the fleets).

The General Board began to reconsider in the spring of 1944. BuShips noted that the as-yet unlaunched Juneau class was already overweight despite every effort to reduce it, which meant a larger hull would be required for any follow-on design, and that projected improvements in aircraft would likely make the move to the 5-inch/54 caliber gun necessary. BuShips presentations of design studies to the General Board in October and then December 1944 showed it was extremely difficult to design a cruiser with adequate armor on a hull displacement large enough to accommodate six or eight twin 5-inch/54 caliber gun mounts plus a robust secondary battery, but small enough to obtain a  speed on two propellers; more propellers would have meant an even larger and more expensive ship, an unacceptable result. Still, six hull numbers were allocated to the project at this time, CL-154 through CL-159.

Cancellation
The CL-154 class was cancelled on 27 March 1945 due to broad naval budget cuts ordered by President Franklin D. Roosevelt, but Secretary of the Navy James Forrestal reinstated the design study on 10 May 1945 in recognition of the Atlanta class's successful history of screening carriers from air attack. In June 1945 BuOrd ranked the 5-inch gun for the CL-154 class as their sixth top priority. The new Ship Characteristics Board / SCB set the final ship characteristics for the class in September 1945, which included dropping the 20 mm and 40 mm secondary batteries in favor of six or eight dual mounts of the new 3"/70 Mark 26 gun. Weeks later the SCB recommended the class be cancelled on cost-effectiveness grounds. The projected ship would be expensive, equal to the cost of two proposed destroyers with similar armament, a proposal that would become the s (but eventually with the single mount 5"/54 caliber Mark 42 gun instead of the dual mount 5"/54 caliber Mark 16): the two destroyers would be more operationally flexible and survivable than – but with only two-thirds of the volume of fire of – the one cruiser. No further action was taken.

See also
 List of cruisers of the United States Navy

References

Notes

Sources

External links
 United States of America 5"/54 (12.7 cm) Mark 16
 Bureau of Ships' "Spring Styles" Book # 3 (1939-1944)

Cruiser classes
Proposed ships of the United States Navy
World War II cruisers of the United States